Epitoxis duplicata is a moth of the subfamily Arctiinae. It was described by Max Gaede in 1926. It is found in Tanzania.

References

 

Endemic fauna of Tanzania
Arctiinae
Moths described in 1926
Insects of Tanzania
Moths of Africa